The following persons have been mayors of the town of Devizes, Wiltshire, England.

Medieval
1302 John Cray (the first Mayor of Devizes)
1376–77 Richard Cardmaker
1379–81 Richard Cardmaker 
1377–79 William Spicer.
1381–82 William Spicer
1388–89 William Coventre I
1391–92 Richard Cardmaker 
1410 Simon Skinner

16th & 17th centuries
1547-51 Richard Batt
1554–55 Thomas Hull
1568 Henry Grube
1573 Henry Grube
1595 John Batt (Also known as John Whittock)
1602–03 John Kent 
1642 Richard Pierce
1694–96 John Child

20th century
1902-03 William Rose (Conservative)
1907–08 Edward Simpson
1988-89 Arthur John Perrett
1991–92 Ludmilia Barnett
1993–94 Margaret Taylor
1994-95 Charles Winchcombe
1995–96 I Hopkins
1997–98 Ray Taylor
1998–99 Jim Thorpe
1999–2000 Noel Woolrych

21st century
2000–01 Timothy Price
2001-02 Ray Parsons
2002–03 Catherine Brown
2003–04 Paula Winchcombe
2004–05 Margaret Taylor
2005–06 Peter Evans
2006–07 Donald Jones
2007–08 Julian Beinhorn
2008–09 Jane Burton
2009–10 John Leighton
2010–11 Peter Smith
2011–12 Sue Evans
2012–13 Kelvin Nash
2013–14 Peter Smith
2014–15 Sarah Bridewell
2015–16 Roger Giraud-Saunders
 2016–17 Jane Burton
 2017–18 Nigel Carter
2019–20 Judy Rose
2020–21 Andy Johnson (died in office, May 2020); subsequently Christine Gay as acting mayor
 2021–22 Christine (Chris) Gay

References

 
Devizes
History of Wiltshire
mayors of Devizes